"Don't Say Goodbye" is a song by Mexican singer Paulina Rubio, taken from her sixth studio album and crossover album, Border Girl (2002). It was written by Joshua "Gen" Rubin and Cheryl Yie and produced by Rubin. "Don't Say Goodbye" is a dance-pop song and talks about rejecting the idea of not saying goodbye to a lover. The song was released through Universal Records on 29 April 2002 as the lead single from the album. In Latin America and France, a Spanish version of the song titled "Si Tú Te Vas" (English: "If You Go") was released, written by Luis Gómez Escolar.

Critical reception towards "Don't Say Goodbye" was mostly positive, who commended the catchy beat and the production. Commercially, the song debuted at number one in Spain and charted inside the top 20 in Australia, Canada, Italy, and Romania. In the United States, the single peaked at number 41 on the Billboard Hot 100, but the remixes were successful on the Maxi-Singles Sales chart. "Si Tú Te Vas" charted within the five on the Billboard Hot Latin Songs and Latin Pop Airplay charts and reached number 55 in France.

The anime-influenced music video for "Don't Say Goodbye" was directed by the Brothers Strause. It had a total budget of $1 million ($1.4 in 2020 dollars), which made it the most expensive music video made up to that point by a Mexican artist; it is one of the most expensive of all time. The video portrays a futuristic city full of tall skyscrapers and a sophisticated train. It features Rubio driving a red motorcycle and numerous backup dancers, surrounded with LED lights in a club.

Composition
 
"Don't Say Goodbye" was written by Cheryl Yie and Joshua 'Gen' Rubin, and produced by Gen Rubin, who also collaborated to the Spanish-language version "Si Tú Te Vas". Both recordings were included for Rubio's sixth studio album Border Girl (2002). The song was recorded at The Engine Studios in Los Angeles, California and at South Beach Studios in Miami Beach, Florida, and was mixed by Bob Rosa (Soundtrack Studio, New York City).

The dance-pop song is backed with breathy and sensually raspy but too wispy vocals by Rubio. According to MTV News, "Don't Say Goodbye" blends buoyant techno beats, sweeping keyboards, jangly guitars and stratospheric vocals. The track is about a former boyfriend of Rubio's who "got goin' just when the goin' was gettin' good". Rubio later explained that the lyrics of the song "remind me a lot to women that we have no problem saying when you really want someone not to leave". The song also appeared in the 2002 movie The Guru in the film's end credits.

Critical reception
"Don't Say Goodbye" received positive reviews from music critics. Chuck Taylor from Billboard called the song "a pure dance beat, sans any hint of Latin instrumental pepperling". In her review, Mike Trias from Radio & Records considered it one of the highlights of the album "with a sexy, get -up- and -dance beat supporting a catchy hook."

Sterling Clover from Stylus Magazine named it in her list Pop Playground Top 20 Favorite Singles of 2002.

Music video

Background and development

The music video for "Don't Say Goodbye" was directed by American duo The Brothers Strause and filmed on 1 April 2002, at the Universal City, California. It was inspired by the Japanese animated post-apocalyptic cyberpunk action film Akira (1988). It had a total budget of $1 million ($1.4 million in 2020 dollars), which made it the most expensive music video in history at the time by a Mexican artist, and currently one of the most expensive of all time. The concept of the video was to portray Rubio as a glamorous girl and cosmopolita that conquers her love interest while traveling on a motorcycle through the avenues of a city very similar to Neo-Tokyo, the ficticial city of Akira. About the concept she said:

We did part of it like a Japanese cartoon, and for the dancing, we feel the rhythm of the song because the beat is almost like a heartbeat. The story is about this love that you feel with someone and he just takes one step back. I was riding the motorcycle with him, and at the end, well, he makes his choice. I was riding the bike 'til the end of love. And I was driving, of course. I was in charge.

Synopsis
The music video for "Don't Say Goodbye" and "Si Tú Te Vas" features a futuristic combination of animation, live action, and dancing shots that loosely convey the narrative of the song. The video opens with Rubio riding her red Akira-style motocycle on the streets of a futuristic city. She stops in middle of an avenue and begins to vocalize the song, while she strut wearing a red, long-sleeved zip-up crop top and pants leather. Purples colored clouds cover the sky and Tokyo-inspired skyscrapers seems around. Now she traveling on the above ground subway to get to the club. At the club, she dance with her dancers on a multi-colored floor, wearing a black lace tube top with a long-sleeved glove on her arm and white demin shorts. Rubio enjoys the club atmosphere, and stops to talk to her love interest, and she leads him onto the dance floor. The video progresses inside a golden space ship-style room with white flashing lights. Rubio struts wearing a lame mini-skirt and orange halter top, while in other scene at the same place, a bodies silhouettes couple dances. Also shows a scene with Rubio on a red couch, dressed a revealing traslucent bandeau top, where she wraps herself in a white fur and lies down. Next shot shows Rubio and her love interest riding on her motocycle. She riding "in charge" while he holds onto her, swaying with her when she makes a turn: the final shots show Rubio moving her hands behind a underneath the pink PAULINA sign.

Reception
The music video has received comparisons to Kylie Minogue's works, in the sense that they both incorporate elements of futuristics and glamour. According to writer Pam Avoledo from her blog I Want My Pop Culture, who observed the similarities, explained "she seems to be modelling herself off of Kylie Minogue rather than Madonna", who supposedly is her biggest influence. Avoledo also observed "as a way to crossover into the US, it's a complicated one [the success] considering the video is more European than American." The music video was nominated in the category "Latin America (North)" at the 2002 MTV Video Music Awards; and for "Video of the Year" at the MTV Video Music Awards Latinoamérica 2002.

Track listings

US CD single
 "Don't Say Goodbye" (English) [Radio Edit] – 3:38
 "Si Tú Te Vas" (Spanish) [Radio Edit] – 3:38

US 12-inch single
 "Don't Say Goodbye" (LP Version) – 4:54
 "Don't Say Goodbye" (Radio Edit) – 3:38
 "Don't Say Goodbye" (Instrumental) – 4:52
 "Don't Say Goodbye" (Acapella) – 4:28

US 12-inch single (Remixes)
 "Don't Say Goodbye" (Sharp Boys European Xpress Vox Mix) – 7:26
 "Don't Say Goodbye" (Mike Rizzo Global Club Mix) – 8:10
 "Don't Say Goodbye" (Flatline Mix) – 8:58
 "Don't Say Goodbye" (Sharp Boys European Xpress Dub) – 8:03

Australian CD single
 "Don't Say Goodbye" (Radio Edit) – 3:40
 "Si Tú Te Vas" (Radio Edit) – 3:40
 "Don't Say Goodbye" (Spanish Fly Radio Mix) – 3:56
 "Fire (Sexy Dance)" – 3:30

Italian 12-inch single
 "Don't Say Goodbye" (Flatline Mix) – 8:58
 "Don't Say Goodbye" (Spanish Fly Club Mix) – 6:41
 "Don't Say Goodbye" (Radio Edit) – 3:38

Japanese maxi-CD single
 "Don't Say Goodbye" (Radio Edit) – 3:38
 "Si Tú Te Vas" (Radio Edit) – 3:38
 "Don't Say Goodbye" (Spanish Fly Club Mix) – 6:38
 "Don't Say Goodbye" (Flatline Remix) – 8:58

UK maxi-CD single
 "Don't Say Goodbye" (Radio Edit) – 3:38
 "Don't Say Goodbye" (Spanish Fly Radio Mix) – 3:54
 "Don't Say Goodbye" (Flatline Mix) – 8:58
 "Don't Say Goodbye" (Video)

European and UK CD single ("Si Tú Te Vas")
 "Si Tú Te Vas" (Radio Edit) – 3:38

European CD single ("Si Tú Te Vas")
 "Si Tú Te Vas" (Radio Edit) – 3:38
 "Don't Say Goodbye" (Radio Edi) – 3:38

European maxi-CD single
 "Don't Say Goodbye" (Spanish Fly Club Mix) – 6:41
 "Don't Say Goodbye" (Album Version) – 4:51
 "Don't Say Goodbye" (Sharp Boys European Xpress Vox Mix) – 7:27
 "Don't Say Goodbye" (Spanish Fly Radio Mix) – 3:56
 "Don't Say Goodbye" (Flatline Remix) – 8:58
 "Don't Say Goodbye" (Sharp Boys European Xpress Dub) – 8:03
 "Si Tú Te Vas" – 4:50

Spanish CD single ("Si Tú Te Vas"/"Don't Say Goodbye")
 "Si Tú Te Vas" (Radio Edit) – 3:38
 "Don't Say Goodbye" (Radio Edi) – 3:38

Mexican CD single ("Si Tú Te Vas"/"Don't Say Goodbye")
 "Si Tú Te Vas" – 3:38
 "Don't Say Goodbye" – 3:38

Mexican maxi-CD single ("Si Tú Te Vas"/"Don't Say Goodbye")
 "Si Tú Te Vas" – 3:38
 "Don't Say Goodbye" – 3:38
 "Si Tú Te Vas" (Spanish Fly Radio Mix) – 3:58
 "Don't Say Goodbye" (Sharp Boys European Xpress Vox Mix) – 7:27
 "Don't Say Goodbye" (Flatline Remix) – 8:58
 "Si Tú Te Vas" (Spanish Fly Club Mix) – 6:43

Credits and personnel
Credits are taken from the CD single liner notes.
 Lead vocals – Paulina Rubio
 Background vocals – Jennifer Karr
 Writing – Gen Rubin, Cheryl Yie (Spanish adaptation: Luis Gómez Escolar)
 Producing, recording and programming – Gen Rubin
 Mixing – Bob Rosa at Soundtrack Studios, New York, NY
 Keyboards – Gen Rubin
 Electric guitar – Rodrigo Medeiros
 Acoustic guitar – Gen Rubin
 Photography – Cesar Urrutia

Charts

Weekly charts

Year-end charts

Sales

Release history

See also
 List of most expensive music videos
 List of number-one singles of 2002 (Spain)

References

Songs about parting
2002 singles
2002 songs
English-language Mexican songs
Paulina Rubio songs
Universal Records singles